MS Norbay is a ro-pax vessel owned and operated by the British ferry company P&O Ferries. She was built by Van Der Giessen-de Noord N.V., Netherlands in 1994.

History 
Norbay was built in Rotterdam in 1994 by Van Der Giessen-de Noord N.V.  She was originally built for Nedlloyd to be placed on the Hull to Rotterdam route with 2040 lane metres of freight and a gross tonnage of 17,464.

However, in 1996  Norbay, while still retaining the same name, route and livery was bought by P&O North sea ferries.

In 2002, the Norsea and Norsun were replaced by the much larger Pride of Hull and Pride of Rotterdam and as a result, Norbay and Norbank became surplus to requirement and were removed from the Hull to Rotterdam route before being transferred to the Irish Sea and entering service on the Liverpool to Dublin route.

Due to restrictions on length at the P&O North Channel berths, Norbay has provided refit cover for both European Causeway and European Highlander in previous years as she is one of the few remaining P&O vessels which can fit within these restrictions. In 2017, the Dover-based freighter, European Seaway provided refit relief instead, taking advantage of the fact that the now upgraded berth at Cairnryan can handle larger vessels. Due to the layup of the European Seaway, Norbay provided refit cover for the European Causeway in September/October 2021. This was the first time she had done so since 2015, though she had visited the port in 2018 for a one-off freight-only sailing.

Design 
The design on the Norbay and Norbank is an evolution of the design used for five freight ferries built by Finacantieri and Van der Giessen for Italy's Viamare sea motorway project. As they were designed as freighters, Norbay and her sister do not have the passenger facilities of vessels on similar passenger routes, though they still have basic facilities for tourist passengers and commercial drivers on their present route.

Sister ships

References

Ferries of England
Ferries of Ireland
1993 ships
Ships of P&O Ferries
Transport in Merseyside